Akhurik is a village in the Akhuryan Municipality of the Shirak Province of Armenia near the Armenia–Turkey border. The Statistical Committee of Armenia reported its population was 1,236 in 2010, up from 1,163 at the 2001 census.

Demographics

References 

Communities in Shirak Province
Populated places in Shirak Province
Armenia–Turkey border crossings